Josep Maria Tamburini i Dalmau (4 December 1856, Barcelona – 1932, Barcelona) was a Catalan art critic and painter, in the Symbolist style.

Biography 
His father, Celestí Tamburini i Valls, was a silversmith. He studied at the Escola de la Llotja with Antoni Caba, then went to Paris, where he worked with Léon Bonnat. Later, he went to Rome and Naples; coming under the influence of Domenico Morelli and Gioacchino Toma. 

In 1888, he was awarded a silver medal at the Barcelona Universal Exposition.

He initially devoted himself to historical works, but moved away from Realism to a type of Symbolism and developed an interest in the English Pre-Raphaelites. As a result, much of his work took on a "literary" quality. 

In 1900, he was one of the co-founders of the "Societat Artística i Literària de Catalunya". He continued to contribute to various periodicals throughout his life. 

References

Sources 
 Mònica Maspoch, Galeria d'autors : ruta del modernisme, Barcelona, Institut del Paisatge Urbà i la Qualitat de Vida, 2008, p. 201. 
 Biography @ the Gran Enciclopèdia Catalana

Further reading 
 DDAA, La col·lecció Raimon Casellas, Publicacions del MNAC, 1992

External links 

Spanish painters
Painters from Catalonia
Symbolist artists
Spanish art critics
Painters from Barcelona
1856 births
1932 deaths